This is a list of Estonian television related events from 1958.

Events
 December – wooden telemast (65 m) was erected in Pärnu.

Debuts

Television shows

Ending this year

Births
 4 July – Tõnu Oja, actor
 9 August – Arvo Kukumägi, actor (d. 2017)

Deaths

See also
 1958 in Estonia

References

1950s in Estonian television